Servicios Postales Nacionales is the company which operates as Colombia's official postal service under the name 4-72.  The company assumed operations from the liquidated state company Adpostal in late 2006.  In addition to providing both national and international mail service and express courier service, 4-72 also facilitates postal payment services, among other services.  The name 4-72 derives from the simplified coordinates of the geographic center of Colombia. It is associated with the Ministry of Information Technologies and Communications.

References

External links

Colombia
Communications in Colombia